Catlinite, also called pipestone, is a type of argillite (metamorphosed mudstone), usually brownish-red in color, which occurs in a matrix of Sioux Quartzite. Because it is fine-grained and easily worked, it is prized by Native Americans, primarily those of the Plains nations, for use in making ceremonial pipes, known as chanunpas or čhaŋnúŋpas in the Lakota language. Pipestone quarries are located and preserved in Pipestone National Monument outside Pipestone, Minnesota, in Pipestone County, Minnesota, and at the Pipestone River in Ontario, Canada.

Name
The term Catlinite came into use after the American painter George Catlin visited the quarries in Minnesota in 1835; but it was Philander Prescott who first wrote about the rock in 1832, noting that evidence indicated that American Indians had been using the quarries since at least as far back as 1637.

Catlinite Properties and Quarries

Minnesota catlinite is buttery smooth and can be cut with a regular hacksaw or even a knife. It comes out of the ground a pinkish color often with a cream layer protecting it from the hard quartzite. It is weaker and more subject to breaking under stress than Utah pipestone. Most catlinite deposits exist beneath the level of groundwater or are in deep enough layers where the soil is constantly moist as the iron compounds which give catlinite its red color quickly convert into iron oxides when exposed to the elements and the stone degrades and breaks down.

The red catlinite from the Pipestone, Minnesota quarries is a soft claystone bed which occurs between layers of hard Sioux Quartzite. Only hand tools are used to reach the catlinite so it takes a long time to get to it. Only enrolled Native Americans are allowed to quarry for the stone at the Pipestone National Monument, and thus it is protected from over-mining. Another quarry is located near Hayward, Wisconsin on the reservation, which the Ojibwa have used for centuries. The stone there is harder than the stone from Pipestone National Monument.

Utah pipestone has a more variable range of hard and soft forms, since it occurs as layers between deposits of harder slates. Utah pipestone is a by-product of slate mining in Delta, Utah, and several natural deposits have been mined and used for pipemaking by Native Americans in the area for millennia.

The Canadian quarry is no longer used, although there are quarries in Canada where another type of pipestone, black stone, is gleaned. The Ojibwe use both the red and black stone for their sacred pipes.

Catlinite is often used to make the hollow tubes in pipeclay triangles.

Other varieties of pipestone

A large range of pipestones exist, not just those in Minnesota, and numerous Native American tribes use a variety of materials in addition to catlinite for pipemaking.

Pipe clay
Smoking pipes molded from wet clay are different from those where the bowl is carved from solid pipestone and then fitted with a wooden stem (as is the case with Catlinite pipes).

The Eastern Band Cherokee are social smokers, and use molded clay pipes for this purpose.

In the United Kingdom, since the 17th century "pipe-clay" has meant a pale, whitish clay. The Oxford English Dictionary defines it as "fine white kind of clay, which forms a ductile paste with water". It is traditionally used for all sorts of polishing and whitening purposes as well as for making tobacco pipes and pottery.

Notes

References
 Sigstad, John S. (1970) "A Field Test for Catlinite". American Antiquity 35:3. pp. 377–382.

External links
 Mississippi Valley Archaeology Center at the University of Wisconsin - La Crosse: Describes the process of making pipes from Catlinite
 Pipestone Artifacts from Upper Mississippi Valley Sites by J. T. Penman and J.N. Gundersen in the Plains Anthropologist

Native American sculpture
Native American religion
Hardstone carving
Pipestone County, Minnesota